Forget the World may refer to:

Forget the World (Afrojack album)
Forget the World (The Hippos album)